O Condado is a comarca in the Galician Province of Pontevedra, centred on the town of Ponteareas (Puenteareas in Castilian Spanish). It covers an area of 341 km2, and the overall population of this comarca was 42,642 at the 2011 Census; the latest official estimate at the start of 2018 was 41,551.

Municipalities

The comarca comprises the following five municipalities:

References

Comarcas of the Province of Pontevedra